BV Den Helder was a professional basketball club from Den Helder, Netherlands. The team had several seasons in the Dutch Basketball League, the highest professional league in the Netherlands. The club is currently inactive, however Den Helder Suns has replaced the club as professional team from Den Helder.

The club has won the Dutch League six times and the NBB Cup once. The club had a long history of financial troubles, with the club being dissolved three times. The last time the club appeared at the highest level was in 2014, as the professional team was declared bankrupt during that season.

History
The club was founded in 1981, as a separation was made between amateur sports club BV Noordkop. BV Den Helder became the separated professional team. The club played in the Eredivisie in its first season. Home games were played in Sporthal Sportlaan and Sporthal de Slenk. With coach Ton Boot the club experienced its best years: the team won the championship six times between 1989 and 1998. Den Helder won the NBB Cup in 1992. In 2005, the club was forced to leave the Dutch Basketball League because of a shortage of money. The club played a few years in an amateur competition. Den Helder returned to the professional level in 2007, but after two seasons the club was declared bankrupt.

Den Helder Kings era
In 2012 the club changed its name to Den Helder Kings, as the first team returned to the Dutch Basketball League again. In its first season the team played in its new home arena KingsDome. The new head coach was Belgian Jean-Marc Jaumin. After a solid first season with a sixth place, the Kings really performed in the following season.

In the 2013–14 season, the team led by Manny Ubilla finished third in the regular season. Before the 2014 Playoffs, the name of the club was changed to "Port of Den Helder Kings" after the club started a conjunction with the Port of Den Helder. In the playoffs, the team beat Magixx 2–0 in the quarterfinals before being swept by SPM Shoeters Den Bosch in the semifinals.

In the 2014–15 season, financial problems troubled the Kings. The team had a €200,000 deficit in their budget and in December the professional team was declared bankrupt. All results of the team were removed and the Kings were expelled from the DBL.

Den Helder Suns

In 2016, a new professional team in the city was founded with the Den Helder Suns which entered the 2016–17 DBL season.

Names
Since its establishment the club frequently changed its name due to sponsorship deals.

Logos

Arenas

Honours 

Dutch Basketball League
 Winners (6): 1988–89, 1989–90, 1990–91, 1991–92, 1994–95, 1997–98
Dutch Cup
 Winners (1): 1991–92

Season by season

European record

Notes

Players

Individual awards
DBL Most Valuable Player
 Jose Waitman – 1987
DBL Most Improved Player
 Jeroen van der List – 2013, 2014
DBL Rookie of the Year
 Eric van der Sluis – 1993
 Tjoe de Paula – 2002
DBL All-Stars
 Manny Ubilla – 2014
 Justin Knox – 2014

Notable players

Head coaches
BV Den Helder
 Ton Boot (1985–1993)
 Meindert van Veen (1993–1995)
Den Helder Seals
 Peter van Noord (2007–2009)
Den Helder Kings
 Jean-Marc Jaumin (2012–2014)

Notes

References

External links
Den Helder Kings on Eurobasket.com

 
Basketball teams established in 1981
Basketball teams disestablished in 2014
Defunct basketball teams in the Netherlands
Former Dutch Basketball League teams
Sports clubs in Den Helder